Gobiopsis arenaria, the patchwork barbelgoby, is a species of goby found in the Indo-West Pacific from Japan south to Australia.

Size

References

Gobiidae
Taxa named by John Otterbein Snyder
Fish described in 1908